Mirror Images 2 is a 1993 American erotic thriller drama film directed by Gregory Dark and produced by Andrew W. Garroni. The film stars Shannon Whirry, Luca Bercovici, Tom Reilly, Eva LaRue and Ken Steadman in the lead roles. The film's music score was composed by Ashley Irwin.

Plot
Carrie and Terrie are a pair of identical twins who are polar opposites. During their adolescence, Carrie was a good student and always well behaved, while Terrie was a bad girl with an insatiable sexual appetite and a habit of seducing her sister's boyfriends. The sisters are separated in youth following the tragic death of their parents. Carrie grows up to marry an abusive louse and is trapped in a sexless relationship, but her problems are about to be compounded when her wicked sister arrives in town, intent on exploiting her physical similarity to her sister to avenge herself for past wrongs. Even the help of a private detective may not be enough for Carrie when Terrie becomes allied with Carrie's own husband.

Cast
 Shannon Whirry as Carrie / Terrie
 Luca Bercovici as Clete Dyker
 Tom Reilly as Jake 
 Eva LaRue as Phyllis
 Ken Steadman as Dan
 Sara Suzanne Brown as Prostitute
 Kristine Kelly as Dr. Erika Rubin 
 Frank Pesce as Clerk

References

External links
 
 

1993 films
1990s erotic thriller films
1990s thriller drama films
American erotic thriller films
American thriller drama films
Films shot in California
Films set in the United States
Films with screenplays by Daryl Haney
1993 drama films
1990s English-language films
1990s American films
Films directed by Gregory Dark